Macromidia is a genus of dragonfly in family Synthemistidae, which is earlier treated as a subfamily of Corduliidae. According to World Odonata List, this genera is best considered incertae sedis. It contains the following species:
 Macromidia ishidai
 Macromidia donaldi

References 

Synthemistidae
Anisoptera genera
Taxonomy articles created by Polbot